Lauwerecht is a former municipality in the Dutch province of Utrecht. It was located northwest of the city of Utrecht and existed from 1818 to 1823. It is now part of Utrecht.

References

Former municipalities of Utrecht (province)